Itacurubí de la Cordillera is a town in the Cordillera department of Paraguay, located 92 km Asuncion.

Etymology

Its name means Itacurubí Guarani "Itakuruvi", "crushed rock."

Weather

The climate in the department of Cordillera is warm and dry. The average temperature is 22 °C, the highest in summer and 39 degrees minimum in winter, grade 3.

Demography

Itacurubí de la Cordillera has a total of 10,744 inhabitants, of whom 5,369 are men and 5,375 women, according to projections by the General Directorate of Statistics, Census and Surveys.

History

Founded on September 18, 1871 by residents of the area, named "Aguilera", is also known as "Garden of the Cordillera."

He was formerly a place of recreation and entertainment for Asuncenos.

The patronal feast is celebrated on 8 October, in honor of Nuestra Señora del Rosario, patron of the city. Currently, there are a popular movement for its inhabitants to the official date of the founding of this city is on 7 October 1871, saw no objective evidence of the exact date of its founding.

Economy

Residents of Itacurubí engaged in agriculture, there are small factories honey cane.

In addition, among the crafts include pottery, crochet, making quilts and poyvi.

Transportation

Access to the city of Itacurubí dela Cordillera by Route II "Mcal. José Félix Estigarribia. "

Tourism

Approximately 1km from the city centre, along the Yhagüy River, is the Grotto Itá Koty (which in Guarani means "stone room").

Throughout the area there are numerous spas.

Itacurubí of the Cordillera has become a place of tourist attraction for domestic and international under the various resorts on the Yhagüy River which, in Guarani, means "water under the shade". It is that indeed the Yhagüy, approximately 85% of their journey, it does so under leafy trees in a natural forest. Likewise, the Yhagüy River slips Mans its crystalline waters on fine white sand and clear 500 meters from the city centre. Its inhabitants, "itacurubienses", are accustomed to the presence of tourists.

Notable people 
 `Blas Cáceres, footballer

Sources 
 World Gazeteer: Paraguay – World-Gazetteer.com
  Secretaria Nacional de Turismo

Populated places in the Cordillera Department